Richard Foerster (born October 29, 1949) is an American poet and the author of eight collections.

His most recent poetry collection is Boy on a Doorstep: New and Selected Poems (Tiger Bark Press, 2019), and his poems have appeared in literary journals and magazines including Poetry, The Nation, The New England Review, Prairie Schooner, TriQuarterly, The Kenyon Review, Shenandoah, The Southern Review. His honors include two fellowships from the National Endowment for the Arts, a Maine Arts Commission Fellowship, and the Amy Lowell Poetry Travelling Scholarship.

He was founding editor of Chautauqua Literary Journal from 2003 until his departure from the journal in 2007 and was a long-time editor at Chelsea Magazine, beginning in 1978. He became editor in 1994, and served in that position until 2001. Foerster received a B.A. in English Literature from Fordham College and an M.A. in English Literature from the University of Virginia. He lives in Eliot, Maine, where he also works as a freelance editor and typesetter.

Published works
 Boy on a Doorstep: New and Selected Poems (Tiger Bark Press, 2019)
 River Road (Texas Review Press, 2015)
 Penetralia (Texas Review Press, 2011)
 The Burning of Troy (BOA Editions, Ltd., 2006)
 Double Going (BOA Editions, 2002)
 Trillium (BOA Editions, 1998)
 Patterns of Descent (Orchises Press, 1993)
 Sudden Harbor (Orchises Press, 1992)

Awards and honors
 2011 National Endowment for the Arts Fellowship for Poetry.
 Amy Lowell Poetry Travelling Scholarship (2000/2001)
 Camargo Foundation Fellowship (1999)
 Hawthornden Fellowship (1997)
 Maine Arts Commission Fellowship (1997)
 National Endowment for the Arts: Creative Writing Fellowship (2011, 1995)
 Bess Hokin Prize (1992)
 Discovery/The Nation Award (1985)

References

External links
Fordham Magazine review of Double Going
 Review of The Burning of Troy by Richard Foerster

1949 births
American male poets
Living people
University of Virginia alumni
Fordham University alumni
People from York, Maine
Poets from Maine
National Endowment for the Arts Fellows
Writers from the Bronx
Fordham Preparatory School alumni